Dr Lankappa Hanumanthaiah is an Indian Dalit poet, Indian politician, of Indian National Congress and a Member of the upper house of the Indian Parliament, the Rajya Sabha, from the state of Karnataka.

Early life and background 
Lankappa Hanumanthaiah was born to  Lankappa and Shrimati Channamma on 10 June 1958.

Hanumanthaiah studied at Government Science College, Bangalore, Post Graduate Studies in Kannada Literature at Bangalore University and Ph.D. from Mysore University.

Books published

Poetry 

 Kappu Kannina Hudugi (Black-eyed Girl), 1990
 Avva (Mother), 1995
 Avvana Kavithe (Mother's Poem), (the poems have been translated and published in Bengali, Gujarati, English, Malayalam and Tamil languages), 
 Akshara Aksharave (Oh' Letters! My Letters!), 2001
 Karna Raaga (Karna's Agony), 2008 
 Harigolu (Hudder), 2012
ಕಳ್ಳಿ ಹಾಲಿನ ಕಡಲು : Kalli Halina Kadalu - Published on 17 August 2020
ಒಂಟಿ ಕಾಲಿನ ನಡಿಗೆ : Onti Kalina Nadige - Published on 3 September 2020

 Dalitha Lokada Olage (In the world of Dalits), 1989
 Ambedkar Mattu Samakaaleenathe (Ambedkar and Contemporary Times), 1993 
 Kanakadasa (biography on saint poet of medieval Karnataka), 1995

Research thesis 

 Katha Kathana (thesis on stories), 1999 
 Ambedkar (a play), (the play has been staged at Bengaluru, Bellary, Tumku Chitradurga and other parts of Karnataka), 1998; Autobiography - Ontikalina Nadige (walk in one leg)

Edited works 

 Ambedkar Kavithegalu (An Anthology of Poems on Dr Ambedkar) for Karnataka Sahitya Academy
 Dalitha Kathegalu (An Anthology of Dalit Short Stories) for Karnataka Sahitya Academy
 Kelavargada Vachanakaararu (Saint poets from the lower strata of the society of 12th century Karnataka)
 Rangabhumi Antharanga: C.G.K. (a commemorative volume on a well-known theatre Director Sri C.G. Krishna Swamy) and (v) Suvarna Sanchaya ( An Anthology of Modern Kannada Poetry from the beginning of the 20th century) for Kannada Sahitya Parishad; Chairman, Committee for publishing Babu Jagjivan Ram’s works in Kannada

Position held

External links 
 Interview with L. Hanumanthaiah on religion and poetry in India by Sahapedia

References 

Living people
Indian National Congress politicians from Karnataka
1958 births